The , also known as , was a Japanese domain of the Edo period. It was associated with Higo Province in modern-day Kumamoto Prefecture.

In the han system, Kumamoto was a political and economic abstraction based on periodic cadastral surveys and projected agricultural yields.  In other words, the domain was defined in terms of kokudaka, not land area. This was different from the feudalism of the West.

History
The domain was centered at the Kumamoto Castle in Kumamoto.

Under the Hosokawa, with an income of 540,000 koku, the  Kumamoto domain was one of the largest in Kyushu, second only to the Satsuma Domain, and excluding the lands held by the Tokugawa and Matsudaira clans, the fourth-largest in Japan after the Kaga, Satsuma and Sendai domains.

List of daimyōs 
The hereditary daimyōs were head of the clan and head of the domain.

Katō clan, 1588–1632 (tozama; 520,000 koku)

Kiyomasa (1562–1611)
Tadahiro (1597–1653)

Hosokawa clan, 1632–1871 (tozama; 540,000 koku)

 Tadatoshi (1586–1641)
 Mitsunao
 Tsunatoshi
 Nobunori
 Munetaka
 Shigekata (1718–1785)
 Harutoshi
 Narishige
 Naritatsu
 Narimori
 Yoshikuni
 Morihisa

Genealogy

Hosokawa Fujitaka (1534–1610)
Tadaoki (1563–1645)
 I. Tadatoshi, 1st daimyō of Kumamoto (cr. 1632) (1586–1641; r. 1632–1641)
 II. Mitsunao, 2nd daimyō of Kumamoto (1619–1650; r. 1641–1650)
 III. Tsunatoshi, 3rd daimyō of Kumamoto (1641–1712; r. 1650–1712)
Toshishige (1646–1687)
 IV. Nobunori, 4th daimyō of Kumamoto (1676–1732; r. 1712–1732)
  V. Munetaka, 5th daimyō of Kumamoto (1716–1747; r. 1732–1747)
 VI. Shigekata, 6th daimyō of Kumamoto (1721–1785; r. 1747–1785)
  VII. Harutoshi, 7th daimyō of Kumamoto (1758–1787; r. 1785–1787)
Tatsutaka (1615–1645)
Yukitaka, 1st daimyō of Udo (1637–1690)
Aritaka, 2nd daimyō of Udo (1676–1733)
Okinari, 3rd daimyō of Udo (1699–1737)
Okinori, 5th daimyō of Udo (1723–1785)
 VIII. Narishige, 6th daimyō of Udo, 8th daimyō of Kumamoto (1755–1835; r. 1787–1810)
Tatsuyuki, 7th daimyō of Udo (1784-1818)
 X. Narimori, 8th daimyō of Udo, 10th Lord of Kumamoto (1804–1860; r. 1826–1860)
 XI.Yoshikuni, 11th daimyō of Kumamoto, 25th Hosokawa family head (1835–1876; r. 1860–1869. Governor of Kumamoto 1869–1871).
Morihisa, 26th Hosokawa family head, 1st Marquess (1839–1893; family head 1876–1893; 1st Marquess Hosokawa: 1884–1893)
Morishige, 27th Hosokawa family head, 2nd Marquess (1868–1914; family head and 2nd Marquess 1893–1914)
Morikei, 1st Baron Hosokawa (cr. 1896) (1882–1898)
Moritatsu, 28th Hosokawa family head, 3rd Marquess, 2nd Baron (1883–1970; 2nd Baron Hosokawa 1898, 14th Hosokawa family head 1914–1970, 3rd Marquess 1914–1947)
Morisada, 29th Hosokawa family head (1912–2005; family head 1970–2005)
Morihiro, 30th Hosokawa family head (b. 1938; family head 2005–). Prime Minister of Japan 1993–1994
 Morimitsu (b. 1972)
  IX. Naritatsu, 9th daimyō of Kumamoto (1788–1826; r. 1810–1826)

See also 
 List of Han
 Abolition of the han system

References

External links

Domains of Japan
Higo-Hosokawa clan